The Khust Castle is an abandoned castle located in the city of Khust in Zakarpattia Oblast (province) in western Ukraine.

The former Hungarian castle lies on a 150-meter high mountain near the center of the city.

The construction of the castle is believed to have started around 1090, during the reign of the Hungarian King St. Ladislaus I and it was finished in 1191, under the Béla III. 

The castle was built as a fortress to protect the salt road from Solotvyno, including the Khust Gate, and the border areas.

The Turkish traveler Evliya Çelebi mentions the castle: "The Khust castle is located at the top of Mount Hassan. Its walls are high and thick, and with its power it is similar to the Iskander fortress, because its height already reaches the sky. Residential buildings facing east face one above the other. The roofs of the palaces are covered with colored tiles, the roofs of the churches - iron, the crosses on them - of pure gold and so shine that the one who looks at them gets tired eyes and is forced, with respect for them, to lower their gaze."

After the defeat of the Hungarian army in the Battle of Mohács in 1526, The Kingdom of Hungary fell apart and the castle in Khust became a part of the Principality of Transylvania.

History

On the outskirts of the city of Khust rises a mountain of volcanic origin, on which in the 11–12th centuries. a castle-fortress was built. From 1281 to 1321 the fort belonged to the Principality of Galicia–Volhynia. In 1480, Matthias Corvinus of Hungary gives the castle to his wife, Queen Beatrice of Aragon. In 1511, Vladislaus II leased Khust Castle with all his possessions for rent to Gábor Perényi for 20,000 gold. In 1669 the commandant of the castle, Mihály Katona, made his inventory, which included 50 guns, several tons of gunpowder, 3,000 cores in 3 warehouses. In 1709 an all- Transylvanian Diet of the supporters of Prince Francis II Rákóczi took place in the castle.

In the 16–17th centuries, Khust and his castle were often fought by the Habsburgs and the princes of Seven, attacked by the Turks and Tatars. The last combat performance of Khust garrison took place in 1717, when soldiers attacked a 12,000th Tatar horde near Vyshkov.

The castle was destroyed by lightning strikes during a storm - one of them in 1766 fell into powder warehouses. The mayor tried to keep the lock, started repairing it, but it turned out to be hopeless. In 1773, Empress Maria Theresa sent her son Joseph to inspect the castle. He ordered the garrison to be transferred to Mukachevo.

In 1798 a storm damaged the last tower of the castle. Authorities gave the local community permission to dismantle the castle on the building stones. In 1799 , the eastern wall of the castle was demolished for the construction of the Catholic Church and various official buildings in Khust.

Hungarian poet Ferenc Kölcsey wrote his famous epigram (Huszt) about the ruins of the castle in 1831.

Today

Only ruins remain. It is possible to walk to the castle from Khust via an uphill trail that starts near the park on the south edge of the city.  The trail begins with flat cobbles and transitions to dirt near the top. It is a 25-minute walk from the center of Khust to the top of the hill. The castle hill offers views of Khust and the surrounding area.

References

 The history of the Khust castle

Khust Raion
Ruined castles in Ukraine
Buildings and structures in Zakarpattia Oblast
Buildings and structures completed in 1191